Allamanda is a genus of flowering plants in the family Apocynaceae. They are native to the Americas, where they are distributed from Mexico to Argentina. Some species are familiar as ornamental plants cultivated for their large, colorful flowers. Most species produce yellow flowers; A. blanchetii bears pink flowers. The genus name Allamanda honors the Swiss botanist and physician Frédéric-Louis Allamand (1736–1809). It is the official flower of Kuching North City Hall.

Description
Plants of the genus are evergreen trees, shrubs, or vines.  They contain a white latex. The leaves are opposite or arranged in whorls of up to 5. The blades are generally oval and smooth-edged, and some are leathery or lightly hairy. The inflorescence is a compound cyme. The flower has five lobed sepals and a bell- or funnel-shaped corolla of five petals, yellow in most species. The fruit is a schizocarp containing two to four seeds.

Chemistry and medicine
In lab analyses Allamanda species have yielded several chemical compounds, including iridoid lactones such as allamandin, plumericin, and plumierides. Plumericin particularly was demonstrated to be a highly potent NF-κB inhibitor with anti-inflammatory activity in vitro and in vivo, while its structurally related derivatives plumierdin, plumeridoid C, and allamandicin did not have activity. The lignan pinoresinol and coumarins such as scopoletin and scoparone have been isolated from A. schottii.

Allamanda species have been used in systems of traditional medicine for various purposes. A. cathartica has been used to treat liver tumors, jaundice, splenomegaly, and malaria.  In analyses, some species have shown some activity against carcinoma cells, pathogenic fungi, and HIV.

Cultivation
In the wild, allamandas grow along riverbanks and other open, sunny areas with adequate rainfall and perpetually moist substrate. The plants do not tolerate shade or salty or alkaline soils, and they are sensitive to frost. They grow rapidly, sometimes spreading 3 meters per year. They can be propagated from cuttings.

Can be trained as a standard.

Ecology
Allamandas have become naturalized throughout the tropics, growing in roadside ditches, abandoned yards, and dumps. A. cathartica in particular is an invasive species in Queensland. Cutting is ineffective as a means of control, because the plants respond to coppicing.

Taxonomy
There are about 12 to 15 valid species in the genus.

Species and synonyms include:

Allamanda angustifolia Pohl
Allamanda blanchetii A.DC. – purple allamanda, violet allamanda, violet trumpetvine
Allamanda calcicola
Allamanda cathartica L. – yellow allamanda, golden-trumpet, common trumpetvine brownbud allamanda
Allamanda doniana Müll.Arg.
Allamanda laevis Markgr.
Allamanda martii Müll.Arg.
Allamanda nobilis T.Moore
Allamanda oenotherifolia Pohl
Allamanda polyantha Müll.Arg.
Allamanda puberula A.DC.
Allamanda schottii Pohl – bush allamanda
Allamanda setulosa Miq.
Allamanda thevetifolia Müll.Arg.
Allamanda weberbaueri Markgr.

References

External links

Allamanda cathartica. In: Francis, J. K. Wildland Shrubs of the United States and its Territories. USDA Forest Service, IITF, Shrub Sciences Laboratory.
 Allamanda. Flora Brasiliensis.

 
Apocynaceae genera